Dr Marjorie "Mo" Mowlam (18 September 1949 – 19 August 2005) was a British Labour Party politician. She was the Member of Parliament (MP) for Redcar from 1987 to 2001 and served in the Cabinet as Secretary of State for Northern Ireland, Minister for the Cabinet Office and Chancellor of the Duchy of Lancaster.

Mowlam's time as Northern Ireland Secretary saw the signing of the historic Good Friday Peace Agreement in 1998. Her personal charisma and reputation for plain speaking led her to be perceived by many as one of the most popular "New Labour" politicians in the UK. When Tony Blair mentioned her in his speech at the 1998 Labour Party Conference, she received a standing ovation.

Early life
Mowlam was born at 43 King Street, Watford, Hertfordshire, England, the middle of three children of Tina and Frank, but grew up in Coventry, where her father progressed to become Coventry's assistant postmaster. She would later be awarded the Freedom of the City in 1999. She was the only one of the family's three children to pass the 11-plus exam. She started at Chiswick Girls' grammar school in West London, then moved to Coundon Court School in Coventry, which, at the time, was one of the first comprehensive schools in the country. She then studied at Trevelyan College, Durham University, reading sociology and anthropology. She joined the Labour Party in her first year. She became the Secretary of the Durham Union Society in 1969 and later went on to become the vice-president of the Durham Student's Union. She worked for then-MP (Labour) Tony Benn in London and American writer Alvin Toffler in New York, moving to the United States with her then-boyfriend and studying for a PhD in political science at the University of Iowa on the effects of the Swiss system of referendums.

Mowlam was a lecturer in the Political Science Department at the University of Wisconsin–Milwaukee in 1977 and at Florida State University in Tallahassee from 1977 to 1979. During her time in Tallahassee, her apartment was broken into by someone; she suspected that it was Ted Bundy, a serial killer and rapist who is thought to have murdered at least thirty-five young women and attacked several others.

Mowlam returned to England in 1979 to take up an appointment at the University of Newcastle upon Tyne. She also worked in adult education at Northern College, Barnsley, with students who had fewer opportunities than traditional university students. In 1981, she organised a series of alternative lectures to the Reith lectures being given that year by Laurence Martin, the university's vice chancellor. These were published as Debate on Disarmament, with their proceeds going to the Campaign for Nuclear Disarmament.

Personal life 
Mowlam married Jonathan Norton, a City of London banker, in County Durham on 24 June 1995; Norton died on 3 February 2009. Mowlam had two step-children from Norton's first marriage to Geraldine Bedell.

Member of Parliament
Having failed to win selection for the 1983 general election, Mowlam was selected as Labour candidate for the safe seat of Redcar after James Tinn stood down. She took the seat in the 1987 general election, becoming the Labour spokesperson on Northern Ireland later that year. Together with Shadow Chancellor John Smith, Mowlam was one of the architects of Labour's "Prawn Cocktail Offensive" dedicated to reassuring the UK's financial sector about Labour's financial rectitude.

Mowlam joined the Shadow Cabinet when John Smith became leader of the Labour Party in 1992, holding the title of Shadow Secretary of State for National Heritage. During this time, she antagonised both monarchists and republicans by calling for Buckingham Palace to be demolished and replaced by a "modern" palace built at public expense. Later, her willingness to speak her mind, often without regard to the consequences, was seen as her greatest strength by her supporters.

Following Smith's death in 1994, Mowlam, alongside Peter Kilfoyle, became a principal organiser of Tony Blair's campaign for the Labour leadership. After his victory, Blair made her Shadow Secretary of State for Northern Ireland. She initially resisted being appointed to the position, preferring an economic portfolio, but, after accepting it, she threw her weight into the job.

In government

In 1997, Mowlam was once again re-elected as MP for Redcar with an increased majority of 21,667. With the Labour Party election win in May 1997, she was made Secretary of State for Northern Ireland, the first woman to have held the post. A reflection of her personal approach was the organisation of a walk about in Belfast city centre.

Good Friday Agreement

Mowlam "oversaw the negotiations which led to the 1998 Good Friday Agreement". On 6 August 1997 she met with the Sinn Féin leader Gerry Adams to have "their first face to face discussions since the breakdown of the IRA ceasefire in February 1996". She was successful in helping to restore the second IRA ceasefire which eventually led to Sinn Féin being included in the multi-party peace talks. The talks led to the Good Friday/Belfast Agreement achieved on the 10th April 1998, bringing an end to conflict in Northern Ireland known as the Troubles.

On the 4th January the Ulster Loyalist UDA/UFF prisoners in the Maze prison, voted not to continue supporting the peace process. Gary McMichael of the Ulster Democratic Party, their political representatives quickly flew to London requesting the Secretary of State meet with the prisoners. After consulting with her advisers and the UK Prime Minister Tony Blair  on Friday 9 January 1998 she visited the Ulster Defence Association (UDA) and Ulster Freedom Fighters (UFF) prisoners represented political by Gary McMichael. The visit was unprecedented for a Secretary of State for Northern Ireland. "The Maze was a focal point of a troubled peace process today as Mo Mowlam arrived for a visit that had been variously described as mad or brave." The same day she also visited the Irish Republican Army (IRA) and Ulster Volunteer Force (UVF) H-block wings of the prison.

The visit was unprecedented and a political gamble, and was potentially dangerous when she met with prisoners, some who were convicted of murder, face-to-face.

She went on to oversee the Good Friday Agreement signing in 1998, which led to the temporary establishment of a devolved power-sharing Northern Ireland Assembly. However, an increasingly difficult relationship with Unionist parties meant her role in the talks was ultimately taken over by Tony Blair and his staff, prompting Mowlam to remark to then-US President Bill Clinton: "Didn't you know? I'm the new tea lady around here". In 1999, Mowlam referred to paramilitary punishment attacks in Northern Ireland as "internal housekeeping" and maintained that the violence did not count as breaking the ceasefire.

Cabinet Office Minister

Whilst her deteriorating relationship with Unionists was the key reason Mowlam was replaced by Peter Mandelson as Northern Ireland Secretary in October 1999, her move to the relatively lowly position of Cabinet Office Minister may have involved other factors, notably her health and her popularity. Mowlam resented being appointed to the post, having previously disparaged it as "Minister for the Today programme". As Cabinet Office Minister, she was reportedly intended to be Tony Blair's "enforcer".

As head of the Government's anti-drugs campaign, in 2002, she called for international legalisation. She caused some controversy when she admitted in 2000 to having used cannabis as a student: "I tried dope. I didn't particularly like it. But unlike President Clinton, I did inhale".

Retirement
On 4 September 2000, Mowlam announced her intention to retire from Parliament and relinquished her seat at the 2001 general election.

After retirement from the House of Commons, she became a critic of government policy on various issues, especially the 2003 invasion of Iraq. She took part in the anti-Iraq War protests alongside Vanessa Redgrave, Tony Benn, Tariq Ali, Ken Livingstone and Bianca Jagger.

Following her retirement, Mowlam became agony aunt for the men's magazine Zoo. She said she missed her constituency work as an MP. She also set up a charity, MoMo Helps, to help drug users who are successfully completing their rehabilitation and provide support for the parents or carers of disabled children.

Her political memoirs, entitled Momentum: The Struggle for Peace, Politics and the People, were published in 2002.

She was the subject of This Is Your Life in January 2003 when she was surprised by Michael Aspel.

Illness and death
Five months before the 1997 general election which took Labour to office, Mowlam was diagnosed with a brain tumour, which she tried to keep private until the tabloid press started to print jibes about her appearance. Although she claimed to have made a full recovery, the various treatments caused her to lose most of her hair. She often wore a wig, which she would sometimes casually remove in public stating that it was "such a bother".

On 3 August 2005, the BBC reported that she was critically ill at King's College Hospital in London. She appeared to have suffered from balance problems as a result of her radiotherapy. According to her husband, she had fallen over on 30 July 2005, receiving head injuries and never regaining consciousness. Her living will, in which she had asked not to be resuscitated, was honoured.

On 12 August 2005, she was moved to Pilgrims Hospice in Canterbury, Kent, where she died at 8.10 am on 19 August, aged 55. She was survived by her husband Jon Norton and two stepchildren. Her death came just 13 days after Robin Cook's, another cabinet minister of the 1997 government.

In January 2010, it was revealed by her ex-doctor that her tumour had been malignant and was the cause of her death. Despite recommendations, she had withheld the true nature of her condition from Tony Blair and the electorate.

Mowlam was an atheist and was cremated in Sittingbourne on 1 September 2005 at a non-religious service conducted by Richard Coles, formerly of the 1980s band The Communards. Half of her ashes were scattered at Hillsborough Castle (the Secretary of State for Northern Ireland's official residence) and the other half in her former parliamentary constituency of Redcar.

Memorials and tributes

A memorial service was held for Mowlam at the Theatre Royal, Drury Lane, on 20 November 2005, another at Hillsborough Castle on 1 December 2005 and another in Redcar on 3 December 2005.

To honour Mowlam, Redcar and Cleveland Unitary Authority commissioned an official memorial mosaic which was unveiled at Redcar's newly refurbished boating lake on 23 October 2009. An intricate 800-tile mosaic, set in a three-metre raised circle, was created by local artist John Todd to illustrate her life and interests. The mosaic has her portrait as the centrepiece, surrounded by images including the beach where she loved to walk, racehorses at Redcar Racecourse (where she celebrated her wedding), the Redcar steelworks, the Zetland Lifeboat, clasped hands and doves (to symbolise the Northern Ireland peace process) and the Houses of Parliament.

The postgraduate common room of Trevelyan College, Durham (Mowlam's alma mater) was renamed "The Mowlam Room" in her honour. The room houses a small bust of Mowlam.

A children's play park named after her is on the Stormont Estate.

Docudrama
In 2009, Channel 4 commissioned a docudramatic film, Mo, portraying Mo Mowlam's life from the Labour election victory of 1997 to her death in 2005. The film starred Julie Walters as Mowlam. Mo was broadcast on 31 January 2010 and attracted over 3.5 million viewers, making it Channel 4's highest-rated drama since 2001. The film was also a critical success, with MP Adam Ingram claiming that it "brought home the essence of Mo". Mo was nominated for a BAFTA for Best Single Drama with Julie Walters and Gary Lewis receiving nominations for, respectively, Best Actress and Best Supporting Actor. The Best Actress award was given to Walters.

References

External links 
 

|-

|-

|-

|-

1949 births
2005 deaths
Academics of Newcastle University
Alumni of Trevelyan College, Durham
British advice columnists
Confederation of Health Service Employees-sponsored MPs
Female members of the Parliament of the United Kingdom for English constituencies
British Secretaries of State
Chancellors of the Duchy of Lancaster
Deaths from brain cancer in England
English atheists
Female members of the Cabinet of the United Kingdom
Labour Party (UK) MPs for English constituencies
Members of the Privy Council of the United Kingdom
People from Watford
Politicians from Coventry
Secretaries of State for Northern Ireland
UK MPs 1987–1992
UK MPs 1992–1997
UK MPs 1997–2001
20th-century British women politicians
21st-century British women politicians
British women columnists
20th-century English women
21st-century English women
British republicans